Elizabeth Lydia Rosabelle, Lady Clifford  ( Bonham, formerly de la Pasture; 1866 – 30 October 1945), as known as Mrs Henry de la Pasture, was an English novelist, dramatist and children's writer. Her children's novel The Unlucky Family has been called a classic of its genre.

Biography
She was born Elizabeth Lydia Rosabelle Bonham in Naples, daughter of Edward Bonham of Bramling, Kent, a British consul.

A Roman Catholic, she married, in 1887, Henry Philip Ducarel de la Pasture of Llandogo Priory, Monmouthshire. The couple moved at Aldrington, near Hove, when Edmée, the elder of their two daughters was born in 1890. Edmée was known by the pseudonym E. M. Delafield (married name Edmée Dashwood) and authored the Provincial Lady series, but predeceased her mother in 1943, whom she failed to mention in her Who's Who entry. The younger daughter, Yolande Friedl, called Yoé, was a medical doctor, who died in London in 1976.

Her first marriage ended in 1908 with the death of her husband. Two years later she married Sir Hugh Clifford, a colonial administrator and a friend of the novelist Joseph Conrad, with whom she lived between 1912 and 1929 successively in the Gold Coast (where she edited an album in 1908), Nigeria, Ceylon and Singapore. He ended his career as Governor of the Straits Settlements. In 1918, she was appointed a CBE.

Works

Fiction
Extra titles and information:
The Little Squire (1893). Children's novel, later dramatised
A Toy Tragedy (1894). Children's novel, translated as Jeanne, la petit mère by Bl. de Méry, 1914
Deborah of Tod's (1897). Later dramatised, reprinted 1898 and 1908
Adam Grigson (1899). Reprinted 1908
Catherine of Calais (1901). Reprinted 1907
Cornelius (1903). Reprinted 1909
Peter's Mother (1905). Dramatised and acted at Sandringham by royal command in 1906, reprinted 1906, 1907 and 1912
The Lonely Lady of Grosvenor Square (1906). Reprinted 1907 and 1909
The Unlucky Family (1907). Children's novel, reprinted 1908, 1946, 1980 and 1988. In his 1980 preface Auberon Waugh called it "one of the great classics of its genre".
The Grey Knight: An Autumn Love Story (1908)
Catherine's Child (1908)
The Tyrant (1909). Reprinted 1910
Master Christopher (1911)
Erica (1912). Entitled The Honorable Mrs. Garry for the 1912 Canadian and 1913 American editions
Michael Ferrys (1913). Entitled Michael for the American edition

Plays
The Man from America (1905). Sentimental comedy
The Lonely Millionaires (1905)
Her Grace the Reformer (1907)

References

External links

 

1866 births
1945 deaths
British dramatists and playwrights
Commanders of the Order of the British Empire
English Roman Catholics
English women novelists
Spouses of British politicians
English women dramatists and playwrights
Wives of knights